

Events

January–February 

 January 9 – Lithuania begins the Klaipėda Revolt to annex the Klaipėda Region (Memel Territory).
 January 11 – Despite strong British protests, troops from France and Belgium occupy the Ruhr area, to force Germany to make reparation payments.
 January 17 (or 9) – First flight of the first rotorcraft, Juan de la Cierva's Cierva C.4 autogyro, in Spain. (It is first demonstrated to the military on January 31.)
 February 5 – Australian cricketer Bill Ponsford makes 429 runs to break the world record for the highest first-class cricket score for the first time in his third match at this level, at Melbourne Cricket Ground, giving the Victoria cricket team an innings total of 1,059.
 February 9 – Billy Hughes, having resigned as Prime Minister of Australia, after the Country Party refuses to govern in coalition with him as the leader of the Nationalist Party, is succeeded by Stanley Bruce. A Liberal–National Coalition will persist in the politics of Australia for at least 95 years.

March–April 

 
 March 1 - Eskom, the largest electricity producer in Africa, is established in South Africa.
 March 6 – The Egyptian Feminist Union (Arabic: الاتحاد النسائي المصري), the first nationwide feminist movement in Egypt, is founded at the home of activist Huda Sha'arawi.
 March 9 – Vladimir Lenin suffers his third stroke, which renders him bedridden and unable to speak; consequently he retires from his position as Chairman of the Soviet government.
 March 17 – Dobrolyot is formed as the first Soviet civil aviation service; it will become part of flag carrier Aeroflot.
 March 18 – In the Bronx, Yankee Stadium hosts its first game.  Babe Ruth hits a three-run homer to defeat the Boston Red Sox 4-1.
 March 23 – A 7.3 earthquake shakes the Chinese province of Sichuan killing 4,800 people.
 March 28 – Regia Aeronautica, the air force of Fascist Italy, is founded.
 April 6 – The first Prefects Board in Southeast Asia is formed, in Victoria Institution, Federated Malay States.
 April 12 – The Kandersteg International Scout Centre comes into existence in Switzerland.
 April 19
 Hjalmar Branting leaves office as Prime Minister of Sweden, after the Swedish Riksdag has rejected a government proposal regarding unemployment benefits. Right-wing academic and jurist Ernst Trygger succeeds him.
 The Egyptian Constitution of 1923 is adopted, introducing a parliamentary system of democracy in the country.
 April 23 – The Gdynia seaport is inaugurated, on the Polish Corridor.
 April 26 – Prince Albert, Duke of York (later George VI, King of the United Kingdom) marries Lady Elizabeth Bowes-Lyon (later Queen Elizabeth The Queen Mother) in Westminster Abbey.
 April 28 – The original Wembley Stadium in London, England, opens its doors to the public for the first time, staging the FA Cup Final between Bolton Wanderers and West Ham United.

May–June 

 May 9
 Southeastern Michigan receives a record  of snow, after temperatures plummeted from 17 °F to 1 °F (-8 °C to -17 °C) between 1 and 6 pm on the previous day.
 The premiere of Bertolt Brecht's play In the Jungle (Im Dickicht), at the Residenztheater in Munich, is interrupted by Nazi demonstrators.
 May 20 – British Prime Minister Bonar Law resigns, due to ill health.
 May 23
 Stanley Baldwin is appointed British Prime Minister.
 Belgium's Sabena Airlines is created.
 May 24 – The Irish Civil War ends.
 May 26 – The first 24 Hours of Le Mans motor race is held, and is won by André Lagache and René Léonard.
 May 27 – The Ku Klux Klan in the United States defies a law requiring publication of its membership.
 June 9 – A military coup in Bulgaria ousts prime minister Aleksandar Stamboliyski (he is killed June 14).
 June 12 – William Walton's Façade is performed for the first time, in London.
 June 13 – President Li Yuanhong of China abandons his residence because a warlord has commanded forces to surround the mansion and cut off its water and electric supplies in order to force him to abandon his post.
 June 16 – The storming of Ayan, Siberia concludes the Yakut Revolt and the Russian Civil War.
 June 18 – Mount Etna erupts in Italy, making 60,000 homeless.

July–August 

 July 10 – Large hailstones kill 23 people in Rostov, Soviet Union.
 July 13 
 The Hollywood Sign is inaugurated in California (originally reading Hollywoodland).
 American explorer Roy Chapman Andrews discovers the first dinosaur eggs near Flaming Cliffs, Mongolia.
 July 20 – Pancho Villa is assassinated at Hidalgo del Parral, Chihuahua.
 July 24 – The Treaty of Lausanne (1923), settling the boundaries of the modern Republic of Turkey, is signed in Switzerland by Greece, Bulgaria and other countries that fought in the First World War, bringing an end to the Ottoman Empire after 624 years.
 July – Hyperinflation in the Weimar Republic (Germany) has seen the number of marks needed to purchase a single American dollar reach 353,000 – more than 200 times the amount needed at the start of the year.
 August 3 – Vice President Calvin Coolidge is sworn in as the 30th President of the United States as a result of the sudden death of President Warren G. Harding in San Francisco a day earlier.
 August 13
 The first major seagoing ship arrives at Gdynia, the newly constructed Polish seaport.
 Gustav Stresemann is named Chancellor of Germany, and founds a coalition government for the Weimar Republic, where hyperinflation means that more than 4,600,000 marks are now needed to buy a single American dollar.
 August 18 – The first British Track & Field championships for women are held in London.
 August 30 – Hurricane season begins, with a tropical storm northeast of the Turks and Caicos Islands.
 August 31 – The Italian navy occupies Corfu, in retaliation for the murder of an Italian officer. The League of Nations protests, and the occupation ends on September 30.

September–October 

 September 1 – The Great Kantō earthquake devastates Tokyo and Yokohama, killing more than 100,000 people.
 September 4 – The United States Navy's first home-built rigid airship  makes her first flight at Naval Air Station Lakehurst (New Jersey); she contains most of the world's extracted reserves of helium at this time.
 September 7 – At the International Police Conference in Vienna, the International Criminal Police Commission (ICPC), better known as Interpol, is set up.
 September 8 – Honda Point disaster: Nine United States Navy destroyers run aground off the California coast.
 September 9 – Turkish head of state Mustafa Kemal Atatürk founds the Republican People's Party (CHP).
 September 10 – The Irish Free State joins the League of Nations.
 September 11 – Struggling for a foothold in southern China, Sun Yat-sen decides to ally his Nationalist Kuomintang party with the Comintern, and the Chinese Communist Party.
 September 13 – Military coup in Spain: Miguel Primo de Rivera takes over, setting up a dictatorship. Trade unions are prohibited for 10 years.
 September 17 – 1923 Berkeley Fire: A major fire in Berkeley, California, erupts, consuming some 640 structures, including 584 homes in the densely built neighborhoods north of the campus of the University of California.
 September 18–26 – Newspaper printers strike in New York City.
 September 24 – Atlantic hurricane season: The second major hurricane strikes north of Hispaniola.
 September 26 – In Bavaria, Gustav Ritter von Kahr takes dictatorial powers.
 September 29 – The first American Track & Field championships for women are held in New Jersey.
 September 29 – The League of Nations Mandate for Palestine (1922) comes into effect, officially creating under British administration the protectorates of Palestine, to provide a homeland for the Jewish people, and the separate Emirate of Transjordan under Abdullah I. The French-administered Mandate for Syria and Lebanon also takes effect.
 September 30 – Küstrin Putsch: Outside Berlin, Major Ernst von Buchrucker, the leader of the Black Reichswehr, attempts a putsch by seizing several forts.
 October 1 – The Johor–Singapore Causeway opens to public traffic.
 October 2 – Küstrin Putsch: After two days of siege, Major Buchrucker and his men surrender.
 October 6 – The Occupation of Constantinople ends when the great powers of World War I withdraw.
 October 13
 Ankara replaces Istanbul (Constantinople), as the capital of Turkey.
 The first recorded example of a storm crossing from the Eastern Pacific into the Atlantic occurs in Oaxaca.
 October 14 – The fourth tropical storm of the year forms just north of Panama.
 October 15 – The fifth tropical storm of the year forms north of the Leeward Islands.
 October 16
 A sixth tropical storm develops in the Gulf of Mexico; a rare occurrence, it consists of four active tropical storms simultaneously.
 Roy and Walt Disney found The Walt Disney Company, at this time known as the Disney Brothers Studio.
 October 23 – Hamburg Uprising: In Germany, the Communists attempt a "putsch" in Hamburg, which results in street battles in that city for the next two days, when it ends unsuccessfully.
 October 27 – In Germany, General Hans von Seeckt orders the Reichswehr to dissolve the Social Democratic-Communist government of Saxony, which is refusing to accept the authority of the Reich government.
 October 28 – In Qajar dynasty Persia, Reza Khan becomes Ahmad Shah Qajar's prime minister.
 October 29 – Turkey becomes a republic, following the dissolution of the Ottoman Empire; Kemal Atatürk is elected as first president.
 October 30 – İsmet İnönü is appointed as the first prime minister of Turkey.

November–December 

 November 1
 The Finnish flag carrier airline Finnair is started, as Aero oy.
 The 1923 Victorian Police strike begins in Australia, with half of the Victoria Police force standing down over the use of labor spies. Rioting and looting take place in Melbourne city centre.
 November 8 – Beer Hall Putsch: In Munich, Adolf Hitler leads the Nazis in an unsuccessful attempt to overthrow the Bavarian government; police and troops crush the attempt the next day. 20 people die as a result of associated violence.
 November 11 – Adolf Hitler is arrested for his leading role in the Beer Hall Putsch.
 November 12 – Her Highness Princess Maud of Fife marries Captain Charles Alexander Carnegie, in Wellington Barracks, London.
 November 15 – Hyperinflation in the Weimar Republic: Hyperinflation in Germany reaches its height. One United States dollar is worth 4,200,000,000,000 Papiermark (4.2 trillion on the short scale). Gustav Stresemann abolishes the old currency and replaces it with the Rentenmark, at an exchange rate of one Rentenmark to 1,000,000,000,000 (one trillion on the short scale) Papiermark (effective November 20).
 November 23 – Gustav Stresemann's coalition government collapses in Germany.
 December 1 – In Italy, the Gleno Dam on the Gleno River, in the Valle di Scalve in the northern province of Bergamo bursts, killing at least 356 people.
 December 6 –
 1923 United Kingdom general election: The governing Conservatives under Stanley Baldwin are reduced to a minority status, with the Labour party gaining second party status. 
 Calvin Coolidge addresses Congress in the first radio broadcast from a U.S. President.
 December 21 – The Nepal–Britain Treaty is the first to define the international status of Nepal as an independent sovereign country.
 December 27 – The crown prince of Japan survives an assassination attempt in Tokyo.
 December 29 – Vladimir K. Zworykin files his first patent (in the United States) for "television systems".

Date unknown 
 The Moderation League of New York becomes part of the movement for the repeal of Prohibition in the United States.
 Pharmaceutical company Novo Nordisk is founded in Denmark.
 Marcel Duchamp's artwork The Bride Stripped Bare by Her Bachelors, Even (La mariée mise à nu par ses célibataires, même or The Large Glass) is completed in the United States.
 The Iraqi women's movement starts with the foundation of the Women's Awakening Club.

Births

January 

 January 1
 Wahiduddin Ahmed, Bangladeshi academic (d. 2018) 
 Valentina Cortese, Italian actress (d. 2019)
 Vulo Radev, Bulgarian film director (d. 2001)
 Roméo Sabourin, Canadian World War II spy (d. 1944)
 January 2 
 Abdel Aziz Mohamed Hegazy, 38th Prime Minister of Egypt (d. 2014)
 Rachel Waterhouse, English historian and author (d. 2020)
 January 3 
 Renato Guatelli, Italian partisan (d. 1944)
 Hank Stram, American football coach, broadcaster (d. 2005)
 January 4
 Ricardo C. Puno, Filipino lawyer and politician (d. 2018)
 Mohan Lall Shrimal, Indian chief justice 
 Wilfred Waters, English Olympic cyclist (d. 2006)
 January 5 
 Virginia Halas McCaskey, American football team owner
 Nat Neujean, Belgian sculptor (d. 2018)
 Sam Phillips, American record producer (d. 2003)
 January 6
 Leah Chase, African-American chef, author and television personality (d. 2019)
 Robert A. Chase, American surgeon and educator
 Norman Kirk, 29th Prime Minister of New Zealand (d. 1974)
 Jacobo Timerman, Argentine writer (d. 1999)
 January 7 
 Gertrude Ehrlich, Austrian-born American mathematician
 Joseph A. Hardy III, American businessman (d. 2023)
 Hugh Kenner, Canadian literary critic (d. 2003)
 Jean Lucienbonnet, French racing driver (d. 1962)
 Johnny Macknowski, Russian-born American basketball player
 Héctor Mayagoitia Domínguez, Mexican chemical bacteriologist and politician
 January 8
 Larry Storch, American actor (d. 2022)
 Johnny Wardle, English cricketer (d. 1985)
 January 11 
 Wright King, American actor (d. 2018)
 Paavo Lonkila, Finnish Olympic cross-country skier (d. 2017)
 Ernst Nolte, German historian (d. 2016)
 January 12 
 Ira Hayes, U.S. Marine flag raiser on Iwo Jima (d. 1955)
 Sune Wehlin, Swedish pentathlete (d. 2020)
 January 15 – Lee Teng-hui, Taiwanese politician, 4th President of the Republic of China (d. 2020)
 January 16
 Max Fink, American neurologist and psychiatrist
 Anthony Hecht, American poet (d. 2004)
 Antonio Riboldi, Italian Roman Catholic prelate (d. 2017)
 Walther Wever, German fighter ace (d. 1945)
 January 18 – Jan Ruff O'Herne, Dutch-Australian human rights activist (d. 2019)
 January 19 – Jean Stapleton, American actress (All In the Family) (d. 2013)
 January 20 
 Nora Brockstedt, Norwegian singer (d. 2015)
 Slim Whitman, American country western musician (d. 2013)
 January 21 
 Lola Flores, Spanish singer, actress and bailaora (d. 1995)
 Prince Andrew Romanov, Russian-American artist and author (d. 2021)
 Pahiño, Spanish footballer who played as a striker (d. 2012)
 Alberto de Mendoza, Argentine actor (d. 2011)
 January 22 – Diana Douglas, British-born American actress, mother of actor/producer Michael Douglas (d. 2015)
 January 23
 Horace Ashenfelter, American athlete (d. 2018)
 Silvano Campeggi, Italian film poster designer (d. 2018)
 Cot Deal, American major league baseball player, coach (d. 2013)
 January 24 – Geneviève Asse, French painter (d. 2021)
 January 25 
 Arvid Carlsson, Swedish scientist, recipient of the Nobel Prize in Physiology or Medicine (d. 2018)
 Rusty Draper, American singer (d. 2003)
 Jacob Korevaar, Dutch mathematician
 Dirk Bernard Joseph Schouten, Dutch economist (d. 2018)
 January 26 – Anne Jeffreys, American actress, singer (d. 2017)
 January 27 – Enrico Braggiotti, Monegasque banker (d. 2019)
 January 28
 Erling Lorentzen, Norwegian shipowner and industrialist (d. 2021)
 Sante Spessotto, Italian Roman Catholic priest and saint (d. 1980)
 January 29 
 Jack Burke Jr., American golfer 
 Paddy Chayefsky, American writer (d. 1981)
 Khir Johari, Malaysian politician (d. 2006)
 January 30
 Leonid Gaidai, Soviet and Russian comedy film director (d. 1993)
 Phan Wannamethee, Thai diplomat
 January 31 – Norman Mailer, American writer, journalist (d. 2007)

February 

 February 1 
 Victor A. Lundy, American architect
 Stig Mårtensson, Swedish racing cyclist (d. 2010)
 Gena Turgel, Polish author, Holocaust survivor and educator (d. 2018)
 Edwin Wilson, American professor 
 February 2
 James Dickey, American poet, author (Deliverance) (d. 1997)
 Virgil Orr, American politician and academic (d. 2021)
 Marshall Rauch, American politician
 Red Schoendienst, American baseball player (d. 2018)
 Liz Smith, American gossip columnist (d. 2017)
 Clem Windsor, Australian rugby union player, surgeon (d. 2007)
 February 3 
 Edith Barney, American female professional baseball player (d. 2010)
 Barbara Hall, English crossword puzzle editor (d. 2022)
 February 4
 Bonar Bain, Canadian actor (d. 2005)
 Conrad Bain, Canadian-American actor (d. 2013)
 Belisario Betancur, Colombian politician, 26th President of Colombia (d. 2018)
 February 5
 Dora Bryan, English actress (d. 2014)
 Fatmawati, 1st First Lady of Indonesia (d. 1980)
 Claude King, American country music singer and songwriter (d. 2013)
 February 6 
 Gyula Lóránt, Hungarian footballer and manager (d. 1981)
 Georges Pouliot, Canadian fencer (d. 2019)
 Vija Vētra, Latvian dancer and choreographer
 February 7 
 Egil Abrahamsen, Norwegian ships engineer
 George Lascelles, 7th Earl of Harewood, first grandchild of King George V (d. 2011)
 William F. Stanton, American politician
 February 8 – Urpo Korhonen, Finnish Olympic cross-country skier (d. 2009)
 February 9 – Brendan Behan, Irish author (d. 1964)
 February 10
 Allie Sherman, American professional football coach (d. 2015)
 Cesare Siepi, Italian opera singer (d. 2010)
 February 11 
 Rosita Fornés, Cuban-American actress (d. 2020)
 Pamela Sharples, Baroness Sharples, English politician (d. 2022)
 February 12 
 Knox Martin, American artist (d. 2022)
 Franco Zeffirelli, Italian film, opera director (d. 2019)
 February 13
 Yfrah Neaman, Lebanese-born violinist (d. 2003)
 Chuck Yeager, American test pilot, NASA official (d. 2020)
 February 15
 Marcel Denis, Belgian comics artist (d. 2002)
 Ken Hofmann, American businessman (d. 2018)
 February 16 – Samuel Willenberg, Polish-born Israeli sculptor, painter and last surviving member of the Treblinka extermination camp revolt (d. 2016)
 February 17 – Jun Fukuda, Japanese film director (d. 2000)
 February 18 – Allan Melvin, American actor (d. 2008)
 February 20 
 Victor Atiyeh, American politician (d. 2014)
 Forbes Burnham, Guyanese politician, 1st Prime Minister of Guyana and 2nd President of Guyana (d. 1985)
 Robert Lucy, Swiss gymnast (d. 2009) 
 February 21 
 Wilbur R. Ingalls Jr., American architect (d. 1997)
 William Winter, American politician (d. 2020)
 February 22 – Norman Smith, English singer, record producer (d. 2008)
 February 23
 Ioannis Grivas, Greek judge, politician and 176th Prime Minister of Greece (d. 2016)
 John van Hengel, American "Father of Food Banking" (d. 2005)
 Mary Francis Shura, American writer (d. 1991)
 February 24 – David Soyer, American cellist (d. 2010)
 February 25 – Harry Leslie Smith, English writer and political commentator (d. 2018)
 February 27 
 Dexter Gordon, American jazz saxophone player, actor (d. 1990)
 James Ross MacDonald, American physicist
 February 28
 Jean Carson, American actress (d. 2005)
 Charles Durning, American actor (d. 2012)

March 

 March 1 – Shantabai Kamble, Indian writer and activist (d. 2023)
 March 2 
 Bob Chinn, American restaurateur (d. 2022)
 Harriet Frank Jr., American film writer and producer (d. 2020)
 Orrin Keepnews, American record producer (d. 2015)
 Robert H. Michel, American Republican Party politician (d. 2017)
 György Pásztor, Hungarian ice hockey player and administrator (d. 2022)
 John Twomey, American athlete
 Graham Winteringham, English architect (d. 2023) 
 March 3 
 Madeleine Arbour, Canadian designer, painter and journalist
 Doc Watson, American folk guitarist, songwriter (d. 2012)
 March 4 
 Russell Freeburg, American journalist and author 
 Piero D'Inzeo, Italian Olympic show jumping rider (d. 2014)
 Sir Patrick Moore, British astronomer, broadcaster (d. 2012)
 March 6
 Ed McMahon, American television personality (d. 2009)
 Wes Montgomery, African-American jazz musician (d. 1968)
 March 7 
 Mahlon Clark, American musician (d. 2007)
 Thomas Keating, American monk (d. 2018)
 March 8 – Louk Hulsman, Dutch criminologist (d. 2009)
 March 9
 James L. Buckley, American politician, United States Senator (1971–77)
 Walter Kohn, Austrian-born physicist, recipient of the Nobel Prize in Chemistry (d. 2016)
 William Lyon, American major general (d. 2020)
 Frank D. Padgett, American judge (d. 2021)
 March 10 
 Val Logsdon Fitch, American nuclear physicist, Nobel Prize laureate (d. 2015)
 Yaacov Liberman, Chinese-born Israeli Zionist politician and author
 Walter Joseph Meserve, American professor, playwright and critic
 March 11
 Agatha Barbara, Maltese politician (d. 2002)
 Devaki Krishnan, Malaysian politician
 Paul Muller, Swiss actor (d. 2016)
 March 12
 Hjalmar Andersen, Norwegian speed-skater (d. 2013)
 Wally Schirra, American astronaut (d. 2007)
 Mae Young, American wrestler (d. 2014)
 March 13 – Phyllis Fox, American mathematician and computer scientist
 March 14 
 Diane Arbus, American photographer (d. 1971)
 Ernest L. Daman, American mechanical engineer, inventor and businessman (d. 2023)
 Joe M. Jackson, American Medal of Honour recipient (d. 2019)
 Celeste Rodrigues, Portuguese singer (d. 2018)
 March 15
 Lou Richards, Australian footballer (d. 2017)
 Willy Semmelrogge, German actor (d. 1984)
 Guy Troy, American modern pentathlete (d. 2023)
 March 19
 Pierre Camu, Canadian geographer and academic
 Oskar Fischer, East German politician (d. 2020)
 Giuseppe Rotunno, Italian cinematographer (d. 2021)
 March 21
 Louis-Edmond Hamelin, Canadian geographer, author and academic (d. 2020)
 Merle Keagle, American female professional baseball player (d. 1960)
 Olive Nicol, Baroness Nicol, British politician, life peer (d. 2018)
 Rezső Nyers, Hungarian politician (d. 2018)
 Jan Reehorst, Dutch politician 
 Nirmala Srivastava, Indian founder of Sahaja Yoga (d. 2011)
 March 22 – Marcel Marceau, world-renowned French mime (d. 2007)
 March 24
 Murray Hamilton, American actor (d. 1986)
 Michael Legat, English writer (d. 2011)
 March 25 
 Lewis Elton, German-English physicist and researcher (d. 2018) 
 Wim van Est, Dutch cyclist (d. 2003)
 Stefano Vetrano, Italian politician (d. 2018)
 March 26 
 Romolo Catasta, Italian Olympic rower (d. 1985)
 Baba Hari Dass, Indian yoga master, silent monk, and commentator (d. 2018)
 Bob Elliott, American comedian (d. 2016)
 March 27 
 Ulla Sallert, Swedish actress, singer (d. 2018)
 Louis Simpson, Jamaican-born poet (d. 2012)
 March 28 
 Thad Jones, American jazz musician (d. 1986)
 Ine Schäffer, Austrian athlete (d. 2009)
 Mike Woodger, English computer scientist
 March 29 – Geoff Duke, British motorcycle racer (d. 2015)
 March 30 
 Milton Acorn, Canadian writer (d. 1986)
 Frank Field, American meteorologist 
 March 31
 Don Barksdale, American basketball player (d. 1993)
 Shoshana Damari, Yemenite-Israeli singer (d. 2006)
 James E. Paschall, American Air Force major general

April 

 April 1 – Mike Grgich, Croatian-born American winemaker
 April 2
 Alice Haylett, American professional baseball player (d. 2004)
 Gloria Henry, American actress (d. 2021)
 Johnny Paton, Scottish football player, coach and manager (d. 2015)
 G. Spencer-Brown, British mathematician (d. 2016)
 April 3 – Jozef Lenárt, Slovak politician (d. 2004)
 April 4
 Maximiano Tuazon Cruz, Filipino Roman Catholic prelate (d. 2013)
 Gene Reynolds, American actor (d. 2020)
 Peter Vaughan, English actor (d. 2016)
 April 5 
 Nguyễn Văn Thiệu, President of South Vietnam (d. 2001)
 Stan Waterman, American cinematographer 
 April 7 – Russell Stone, New Zealand historian, author and professor
 April 8
 George Fisher, American political cartoonist (d. 2003)
 Edward Mulhare, Irish-born American actor (d. 1997)
 April 10 
 Stuart Tave, American literary scholar
 John Watkins, South African cricketer (d. 2021)
 April 11 – David H. Murdock, American billionaire, businessman and philanthropist 
 April 12 
 Ann Miller, American actress and dancer (d. 2004)
 Krastyu Trichkov, Bulgarian politician 
 April 13 – Don Adams, American actor, comedian (Get Smart) (d. 2005)
 April 14 
 Lydia Clarke, American actress, photographer (d. 2018)
 Roberto De Vicenzo, Argentine professional golfer, winner of the 1967 Open Championship (d. 2017)
 April 15 
 Gabriel Reymond, Swiss racewalker
 Douglas Wass, British civil servant (d. 2017)
 April 17 – Étienne Bally, French sprinter (d. 2018)
 April 18 
 Gershon Edelstein, Israeli rabbi and spiritual leader 
 Mary Ellen Hawkins, American politician (d. 2023)
 April 19 
 Sen Sōshitsu XV, Japanese hereditary master
 Stuart H. Walker, American Olympic yachtsman and writer (d. 2018)
 April 20
 Mother Angelica, American nun, founder of the Eternal Word Television Network (EWTN) (d. 2016)
 Irene Lieblich, Polish-born painter (d. 2008)
 Bill Spence, English writer 
 April 22
 Paula Fox, American writer (d. 2017)
 Geoffrey Hattersley-Smith, English/Canadian geologist and glaciologist (d. 2012)
 Bettie Page, American model (d. 2008)
 Aaron Spelling, American television producer, writer (d. 2006)
 April 23 – Dolph Briscoe, Governor of Texas (d. 2010)
 April 24 
 Sir John Conant, 2nd Baronet, English aristocrat
 Bülent Ulusu, 18th Prime Minister of Turkey (d. 2015)
 April 25 
 Francis Graham-Smith, English astronomer, academic 
 Albert King, American musician (d. 1992)
 Grant Munro, Canadian animator, filmmaker and actor (d. 2017)
 April 27 – Lloyd F. Wheat, American lawyer and politician (d. 2004)
 April 29 – Walter Deutsch, Austrian musicologist
 April 30
 Al Lewis, American actor (The Munsters) (d. 2006)
 Francis Tucker, South African rally driver (d. 2008)

May 

 May 1 
 Frank Brian, American basketball player (d. 2017)
 Fernando Cabrita, Portuguese football forward, manager (d. 2014)
 Joseph Heller, American novelist (Catch-22) (d. 1999)
 Ralph Senensky, American television director and writer 
 Billy Steel, Scottish footballer (d. 1982)
 May 2 
 Patrick Hillery, President of Ireland (d. 2008)
 Paul Shooner, Canadian politician
 May 3
 Francis Bellotti, American lawyer and politician
 Francesco Paolo Bonifacio, Italian politician and jurist (d. 1989)
 Alexander Harvey II, American judge (d. 2017)
 May 4
 Carlo Giustini, Italian actor 
 Gillis William Long, American politician (d. 1985)
 Assi Rahbani, Lebanese composer, musician, conductor, poet and author (d. 1986)
 Eric Sykes, English actor (d. 2012)
 May 5 
 Sergey Akhromeyev, Soviet marshall, former Chief of the General Staff of the Soviet Armed Forces (d. 1991)
 Ezekiel Guti, Zimbabwean pastor and archbishop 
 Edit Perényi-Weckinger, Hungarian gymnast (d. 2019)
 Konrad Repgen, German historian (d. 2017)
 Richard Wollheim, English philosopher (d. 2003)
 Archduchess Yolande of Austria
 May 6 – Josep Seguer, Spanish football defender, manager (d. 2014)
 May 7
 Anne Baxter, American actress (d. 1985)
 Jim Lowe, American singer-songwriter (d. 2016)
 J. Mack Robinson, American businessman (d. 2014)
 May 8 
 Louise Meriwether, American novelist, journalist and activist
 Yusof Rawa, Malaysian politician (d. 2000)
 May 10 – Heydar Aliyev, 3rd President of Azerbaijan (1993–2003) (d. 2003)
 May 11 
 Louise Arnold, American baseball player (d. 2010)
 Eugenio Calabi, Italian-born American mathematician
 Fred McLafferty, American chemist (d. 2021)
 May 12 – Mila del Sol, Filipino actress, entrepreneur and philanthropist (d. 2020) 
 May 13 
 Ruth Adler Schnee, German-American textile, interior designer (d. 2023)
 John Pearce, Australian tennis player (d. 1992)
 May 14
 Willis Blair, Canadian politician (d. 2014) 
 Alberto Ortiz, Uruguayan pentathlete
 Adnan Pachachi, Iraqi Foreign Minister (d. 2019)
 Mrinal Sen, Indian filmmaker (d. 2018)
 May 15
 Doris Dowling, American actress (d. 2004)
 John Lanchbery, English composer (d. 2003)
 Gholamreza Pahlavi, Persian prince (d. 2017)
 May 16 
 Merton Miller, American economist, Nobel Prize laureate (d. 2000)
 Lingam Suryanarayana, Indian surgeon
 May 17 
 Anthony Eyton, English painter and educator 
 Peter Mennin, American composer, teacher and administrator (d. 1983)
 David Wasawo, Kenyan zoologist, conservationist, and university administrator (d. 2014)
 May 18 – Hugh Shearer, Prime Minister of Jamaica (d. 2004)
 May 19 – Peter Lo Sui Yin, Malaysian politician (d. 2020)
 May 20 – Israel Gutman, Israeli historian (d. 2013)
 May 21
 Armand Borel, Swiss mathematician (d. 2003)
 Dorothy Hewett, Australian writer (d. 2002)
 Ara Parseghian, American football coach (d. 2017)
 Evelyn Ward, American actress (d. 2012)
 May 22 – Aline Griffith, Dowager Countess of Romanones, Spanish-American cipher clerk, aristocrat, socialite and writer (d. 2017)
 May 23 
 Ranajit Guha, Indian historian
 Kalidas Shrestha, Nepalese artist (d. 2016)
 May 24
 Knut Ahnlund, Swedish literary historian, writer (d. 2012)
 Seijun Suzuki, Japanese filmmaker, actor and screenwriter (d. 2017)
 May 25 – Bernard Koura, French painter (d. 2018)
 May 26
 James Arness, American actor (Gunsmoke) (d. 2011)
 Roy Dotrice, English actor (d. 2017)
 Horst Tappert, German television actor (d. 2008)
 May 27
 Henry Kissinger, German-born United States Secretary of State, recipient of the Nobel Peace Prize
 Sumner Redstone, American businessman (d. 2020)
 Alfonso Wong, Hong Kong cartoonist (d. 2017)
 May 28
 György Ligeti, Hungarian composer (d. 2006)
 N. T. Rama Rao, Indian (Telugu) film actor, politician (d. 1996)
 T. M. Thiagarajan, Carnatic musicologist from Tamil Nadu in Southern India (d. 2007)
 May 29 
 Edward H. Sims, American author 
 Eugene Wright, American jazz bassist (d. 2020)
 May 30 
 Zdeněk Košta, Czech cyclist
 Jimmy Lydon, American actor, producer (d. 2022)
 Dennis V. Razis, Greek oncologist 
 May 31 
 Robert O. Becker, American orthopedic surgeon (d. 2008)
 Ellsworth Kelly, American artist (d. 2015)
 Rainier III, Prince of Monaco (d. 2005)

June 

 June 2
 Ted Leehane, Australian rules footballer (d. 2014)
 Lloyd Shapley, American mathematician, economist and Nobel Prize laureate (d. 2016)
 June 3 
 Phil Nimmons, American jazz musician and composer
 Peter Thorne, British Royal Air Force pilot (d. 2014)
 June 4 
 Elizabeth Jolley, Australian writer (d. 2007)
 Yuriko, Princess Mikasa, Japanese princess 
 June 5 – Peggy Stewart, American actress (d. 2019)
 June 6 
 V. C. Andrews, American novelist (d. 1996)
 Jeff Dwire, American small businessman (d. 1974)
 June 7 
 Jean Baratte, French international footballer, striker and manager (d. 1986)
 Giorgio Belladonna, Italian bridge player, one of the greatest of all time (d. 1995)
 Harold Garde, American artist (d. 2022)
 June 8 
 Alice Coleman, English geographer
 Tang Hsiang Chien, Hong Kong industrialist (d. 2018)
 June 9 
 Stanley Michael Gartler, American molecular biologist and geneticist
 Gerald Götting, German politician (d. 2015)
 René Henry Gracida, American bishop 
 I. H. Latif, Indian military officer (d. 2018)
 June 10 
 Madeleine Lebeau, French actress (d. 2016)
 Robert Maxwell, Slovakian-born media entrepreneur (d. 1991)
 Françoise Sullivan, Canadian painter, sculptor, dancer and choreographer.
 June 11 – Bernard F. Grabowski, American politician (d. 2019)
 June 12 
 Juan Arza, Spanish football forward, manager (d. 2011)
 Herta Elviste, Estonian actress (d. 2015)
 June 13 – Lloyd Conover, American scientist (d. 2017)
 June 14 
 Jack Hayward, English businessman (d. 2014)
 Silvia Infantas, Chilean singer and actress
 Judith Kerr, English writer, illustrator (d. 2019)
 Kari Polanyi Levitt, Canadian economist
 Donald Smith, English cricketer (d. 2021)
 June 15
 Herbert Chitepo, Zimbabwe African National Union leader (d. 1975)
 Johnny Most, American basketball radio announcer (d. 1993)
 Ninian Stephen, 20th Governor-General of Australia (d. 2017)
 June 17
 William G. Adams, 9th mayor of St. John's, member of the Newfoundland and Labrador House of Assembly (d. 2005)
 Enrique Angelelli, Argentine bishop (d. 1976)
 Anthony Bevilacqua, American Roman Catholic cardinal (d. 2012)
 Sukh Dev, Indian organic chemist, academic and researcher
 W. M. Gorman, Irish economist, academic (d. 2003)
 Arnold S. Relman, American internist (d. 2014)
 Jan Veselý, Czech cyclist (d. 2003)
 June 18 
 Clinton Ballou, American biochemist and professor (d. 2021)
 Szymon Szurmiej, Polish-Jewish actor, director, and general manager (d. 2014)
 Elizabeth Weber, South African literary writer
 June 19 
 Geri M. Joseph, American journalist and academic
 Andrés Rodríguez, 47th President of Paraguay (d. 1997)
 June 20 
 Arthur Upton, South African cricketer
 Bjørn Watt-Boolsen, Danish actor (d. 1998)
 Franklin B. Zimmerman, American musicologist and conductor 
 June 21 – Johann Eyfells, Icelandic artist (d. 2019)
 June 22 
 John Oldham, American college player, athletic director and basketball coach (d. 2020)
 Felo Ramírez, Cuban-American Spanish-language radio voice of the Miami Marlins (d. 2017)
 June 23 
 André Antunes, Portuguese sports shooter (d. 2002)
 Makhmut Gareev, Russian general (d. 2019)
 Doris Johnson, American politician
 Mario Milita, Italian actor and voice actor (d. 2017)
 Silkirtis Nichols, Native American Indian actor (d. 2016)
 Ranasinghe Premadasa, Sri Lanka statesman, 3rd President of Sri Lanka (d. 1993)
 Jerry Rullo, American professional basketball player (d. 2016)
 John E. Sarno, American medical writer (d. 2017)
 Giuseppina Tuissi, Italian Resistance fighter (d. 1945)
 June 24 
 Yves Bonnefoy, French poet, art historian (d. 2016)
 Cesare Romiti, Italian economist (d. 2020)
 T-Model Ford, African-American blues musician (d. 2013)
 Benjamin de Vries, Dutch-born Israeli economic historian 
 June 25
 Jamshid Amouzegar, 43rd Prime Minister of Iran (d. 2016)
 Stan Clements, English footballer (d. 2018)
 Doug Everingham, Australian politician, minister (d. 2017)
 Sam Francis, American painter (d. 1994)
 Vatroslav Mimica, Croatian film director, screenwriter (d. 2020)
 June 26 
 Ed Bearss, American military historian and author (d. 2020)
 Barbara Graham, American criminal (d. 1955)
 Jonah Kinigstein, American artist
 Musa'id bin Abdulaziz Al Saud, Saudi prince (d. 2013)
 June 27 
 Beth Chatto, British plantswoman, garden designer and author (d. 2018)
 Mitchell Flint, American lawyer, veteran aviator (d. 2017)
 Gus Zernial, American baseball player, sports commentator (d. 2011)
 June 28 
 Daniil Khrabrovitsky, Soviet film director (d. 1980)
 Giff Roux, American basketball player (d. 2011)
 Gaye Stewart, Canadian ice hockey forward (d. 2010)
 June 29 
 Sérgio Britto, Brazilian actor (d. 2011)
 Renyldo Ferreira, Brazilian equestrian
 Alfred Goodwin, senior judge on the United States Court of Appeals for the Ninth Circuit (d. 2022)
 Olav Thon, Norwegian real estate magnate
 Chou Wen-chung, Chinese-American composer, educator (d. 2019)
 June 30 
 Gad Beck, Israeli-German educator, author, activist and Holocaust survivor (d. 2012)
 Andy Jack, English footballer
 Ivo Orlandi, Venezuelan sports shooter (d. 2000)

July 

 July 1
 Scotty Bowers, American marine, author (d. 2019)
 Herman Chernoff, American applied mathematician, statistician and physicist
 July 2
 Constantin Dăscălescu, 52nd Prime Minister of Romania (d. 2003)
 Wisława Szymborska, Polish writer, Nobel Prize laureate (d. 2012)
 July 3 
 Hugo Machado, Uruguayan cyclist (d. 2015)
 Felipe Zetter, Mexican football defender (d. 2013)
 July 4 
 Rudolf Friedrich, Swiss Federal Councilor (d. 2013)
 George Mostow, American mathematician, renowned for his contributions to Lie theory (d. 2017)
 July 5 
 Hermann Gummel, German semiconductor industry pioneer (d. 2022)
 Naomi Long Madgett, American poet (d. 2020)
 Mitsuye Yamada, Japanese-American activist, feminist, essayist, poet, story writer, editor, and former English professor
 July 6 
 Constantin Bălăceanu-Stolnici, Romanian neurologist
 Wojciech Jaruzelski, Polish Communist politician, 8th Prime Minister of Poland and President of Poland (d. 2014)
 Kallu Dhani Ram, Fijian farmers activist
 July 7 
 Leonardo Ferrel, Bolivian football player (d. 2013)
 Whitney North Seymour Jr., American administrator (d. 2019)
 Kitty White, American jazz singer (d. 2009)
 July 8 
 Val Bettin, American actor (d. 2021)
 Harrison Dillard, African-American track and field athlete (d. 2019)
 Ivor Germain, Barbadian professional light/welterweight boxer (d. 1982)
 Eric Hill, English cricketer (d. 2010)
 July 9 – Jill Knight, British politician (d. 2022)
 July 10
 Amalia Mendoza, Mexican singer and actress (d. 2001)
 John Bradley, U.S. Navy flag raiser on Iwo Jima (d. 1994)
 Stanton Forbes, American writer (d. 2013)
 Rudolf Kehrer, Soviet and Russian classical pianist (d. 2013)
 Mátyás Tímár, Hungarian politician and economist (d. 2020)
 July 11 
 Olavo Rodrigues Barbosa, Brazilian football player (d. 2010)
 Gilbert Morand, French non-commissioned officer, skier (d. 2008)
 Roy Neighbors, American politician (d. 2017)
 Richard Pipes, Polish-American academic who specialized in Russian history (d. 2018)
 Bernard Punsly, American actor (d. 2004)
 July 12 
 Francisco Castro, Puerto Rican long jumper, triple jumper (d. 2008)
 Freddie Fields, American theatrical agent, film producer (d. 2007)
 James E. Gunn, American science fiction writer, editor, scholar, and anthologist (d. 2020)
 July 13
 Alexandre Astruc, French film critic, director (d. 2016)
 Ashley Bryan, American writer and illustrator (d. 2022)
 James H. Harvey, American Air Force officer
 Shmuel Laviv-Lubin, Israeli sports shooter
 Erich Lessing, Austrian photographer (d. 2018)
 Norma Zimmer, American singer (d. 2011)
 July 14
 María Martín, Spanish actress (d. 2014)
 Dale Robertson, American actor (d. 2013)
 July 15 – Francisco de Andrade, Portuguese competitive sailor, Olympic medalist
 July 16
 Chris Argyris, American business theorist (d. 2013)
 Mari Evans, African-American poet (d. 2017)
 Giuseppe Madini, Italian professional football player (d. 1998)
 Len Okrie, American catcher (d. 2018)
 July 18
 Jerome H. Lemelson, American inventor (d. 1997)
 Michael Medwin, English actor (d. 2020)
 Odvar Omland, Norwegian politician
 July 19
 Alex Hannum, American basketball player (d. 2002)
 Soini Nikkinen, Finnish javelin thrower (d. 2012)
 July 20
 Stanisław Albinowski, Polish economist, journalist (d. 2005)
 Elisabeth Becker, German Nazi war criminal (d. 1946)
 James Bree, British actor (d. 2008)
 July 21
 Walter Brenner, American professor (d. 2017)
 Rudolph A. Marcus, Canadian chemist, Nobel Prize laureate
 William Wise, American children's writer 
 July 22
 Bob Dole, American Republican politician, Presidential candidate (d. 2021)
 Anthony Enahoro, Nigerian politician (d. 2010)
 Mukesh, Indian singer (d. 1976)
 The Fabulous Moolah, American professional wrestler (d. 2007)
 July 23
 Witto Aloma, Cuban Major League Baseball player (d. 1997)
 Morris Halle, Latvian-American linguist (d. 2018)
 July 24 – Albert Vanhoye, French cardinal (d. 2021)
 July 25
 Estelle Getty, American actress (d. 2008)
 Leonardo Villar, Brazilian actor (d. 2020)
 July 28 
 Robert P. Madison, American architect
 Ian McDonald, Australian cricketer (d. 2019)
 July 29 
 Edgar Cortright, American scientist, engineer (d. 2014)
 Jim Marshall, British founder of Marshall Amplification (d. 2012)
 July 31
 Stephanie Kwolek, American chemist noted for inventing Kevlar (d. 2014)
 Jean-Jacques Moreau, French mathematician, mechanician (d. 2014)
 William Joseph Nealon Jr., American judge (d. 2018)
 Kent Rogers, American actor (d. 1944)

August 

 August 2
Shimon Peres, 8th Prime Minister of Israel, 9th President of Israel, recipient of the Nobel Peace Prize (d. 2016)
Charlie Wells, American crime novelist (d. 2004)
Ike Williams, American boxer (d. 1994)
 August 3
 Jean Hagen, American actress (d. 1977)
 Anne Klein, American fashion designer (d. 1974)
 Pope Shenouda III of Alexandria, Pope of the Coptic Orthodox Church of Alexandria (d. 2012)
 August 4 
 Cornelia Groefsema Kennedy, American judge (d. 2014)
 Santiago Riveros, Argentine general
 Franz Karl Stanzel, Austrian literary theorist
 August 5 
 Sir Michael Kerry, QC, British civil servant, Procurator General and Treasury Solicitor (d. 2012)
 Devan Nair, third President of Singapore (d. 2005)
 August 6 
 John Dunmore, New Zealand academic, historian and author
 Paul Hellyer, Canadian engineer, politician (d. 2021)
 Moira Lister, Anglo-South African film, stage and television actress (d. 2007)
 Jack Parnell, English producer, bandleader and musician (d. 2010)
 August 7 – Ramesh Mehta, Indian playwright, director and actor 
 August 8 
 Eve Miller, American actress (d. 1973)
 Latifa al-Zayyat, Egyptian activist, writer (d. 1996)
 August 9 – John Stephenson, American actor and voice actor (d. 2015)
 August 10
 Iosif Fabian, Romanian football striker, coach (d. 2008)
 Rhonda Fleming, American actress (d. 2020)
 Fred Ridgway, English cricketer (d. 2015)
 David H. Rodgers, American politician (d. 2017)
 August 11 
 Jeanne Bisgood, English golfer
 Roy Roper, New Zealand rugby player 
 August 12 
 Ruth Stiles Gannett, American children's writer
 Carlo Smuraglia, Italian politician and partisan (d. 2022)
 August 14 
 Kuldip Nayar, Indian journalist, human rights activist and politician (d. 2018)
 Ivan Uzlov, Soviet-born Ukrainian scientist and metallurgist
 August 15 
 Enver Mamedov, Soviet diplomat and media manager
 Rose Marie, American actress, comedian, and singer (d. 2017)
 August 16 – Millôr Fernandes, Brazilian cartoonist, playwright (d. 2012)
 August 17 – Carlos Cruz-Diez, Venezuelan artist (d. 2019)
 August 19
 Esmeralda Agoglia, Argentinian ballerina (d. 2014)
 August 20 – Jim Reeves, American country singer (d. 1964)
 August 21 – Larry Grayson, English comedian, game show host (d. 1995)
 August 22 
 Guenter Lewy, German-born American author and political scientist 
 Aldo Scavarda, Italian cinematographer
 Carolina Slim, American Piedmont blues singer, guitarist (d. 1953)
 August 23
 Siti Hartinah, 2nd First Lady of Indonesia, wife of Suharto (d. 1996)
 Artturi Niemelä, Finnish homesteader and politician (d. 2021)
 Henry F. Warner, American soldier, Medal of Honor recipient (d. 1944)
 August 24 
 Eddie Deerfield, American government official (d. 2022)
 Arthur Jensen, American educational psychologist (d. 2012)
 August 25 – Luis Abanto Morales, Peruvian singer, composer (d. 2017)
 August 26 
 N. A. Ramaiah, Indian physical chemist
 Wolfgang Sawallisch, German conductor, pianist (d. 2013)
 August 27
 Inge Egger, Austrian actress (d. 1976)
 Hun Neang, father of Cambodian Prime Minister Hun Sen (d. 2013) 
 August 28 
 Arthur Payne, Australian speedway rider
 Andrea Veggio, Italian Roman Catholic bishop (d. 2020)
 August 29
 Sir Richard Attenborough, English actor, film director (d. 2014)
 Maurizio Bucci, Italian diplomat
 Ashi Tashi Dorji, Bhutanese politician
 Marmaduke Hussey, Baron Hussey of North Bradley, chairman of the BBC (d. 2006)
 August 30 
 Joseph Lawson Howze, American Roman Catholic bishop (d. 2019)
 Giacomo Rondinella, Italian singer, actor (d. 2015)
 Vic Seixas, American tennis player
 August 31 – Emilinha Borba, popular Brazilian singer (d. 2005)

September

 September 1
 Rocky Marciano, American boxer (d. 1969)
 Tunku Ampuan Najihah, Queen consort of Malaysia
 Kenneth Thomson, Canadian businessman, art collector (d. 2006)
 September 2 – Ramón Valdés, Mexican actor, comedian, songwriter and entrepreneur (d. 1988)
 September 3
 Glen Bell, American entrepreneur, founder of Taco Bell (d. 2010)
 Mort Walker, American cartoonist, creator of Beetle Bailey (d. 2018)
 September 4 
 Mirko Ellis, Swiss-Italian actor (d. 2014)
 Ram Kishore Shukla, Indian politician (d. 2003)
 Mushtaq Ahmad Yusufi, Pakistani banker, writer and humorist (d. 2018)
 September 5 – Aileen Adams, English consultant anaesthetist
 September 6 
 Eloy Tato Losada, Spanish Roman Catholic bishop (d. 2022)
 King Peter II of Yugoslavia (d. 1970)
 September 7
 Madeleine Dring, British composer, actress (d. 1977)
 Peter Lawford, English actor (d. 1984)
 Bill Nankivell, Australian politician 
 September 8 
 Joy Laville, English-Mexican sculptor, potter and painter (d. 2018)
 Eleanor Vadala, American chemist, materials engineer and balloonist
 September 9
 Daniel Carleton Gajdusek, American virologist, recipient of the Nobel Prize in Physiology or Medicine (d. 2008)
 Cliff Robertson, American actor (d. 2011)
 Charles Grier Sellers, American historian (d. 2021)
 Marcel Zanini, Turkish-born French jazz musician (d. 2023)
 September 10 
 Uri Avnery, Israeli writer (d. 2018)
 Joe Wallach, American businessman 
 September 11 
 Vasilije Mokranjac, Serbian composer (d. 1984)
 Harry D. Schultz, American investment adviser and author
 September 12 – Joe Shulman, American jazz bassist (d. 1957)
 September 13 
 Natália Correia, Portuguese writer, poet and social activist (d. 1993)
 U. L. Gooch, American politician (d. 2021)
 Zoya Kosmodemyanskaya, Soviet partisan (d. 1941)
 September 14 – Carl-Erik Asplund, Swedish speed skater
 September 15 – Audrey Stuckes, English material scientist (d. 2006)
 September 16 – Lee Kuan Yew, Prime Minister of Singapore (d. 2015)
 September 17 
 David Oreck, American entrepreneur (d. 2023)
 Hank Williams, American country musician (d. 1953)
 September 18 
 Queen Anne of Romania, born Princess Anne of Bourbon-Parma, French-born queen consort (d. 2016)
 Al Quie, American politician 
 September 20 – Geraldine Clinton Little, Northern Ireland-born poet (d. 1997)
 September 21 
 Carol Berman, American politician
 Linwood Holton, American politician (d. 2021)
 Luba Skořepová, Czech actress (d. 2016)
 September 22 – Dannie Abse, Welsh poet (d. 2014)
 September 23 
 Anita Cornwell, American lesbian feminist author
 Basil Feldman, Baron Feldman, English politician (d. 2019)
 Eberhard W. Kornfeld, Swiss auctioneer and art collector
 Maybell Lebron, Argentine-born Paraguayan writer 
 Socorro Ramos, Filipino entrepreneur 
 Shubert Spero, American rabbi
 Jimmy Weldon, American voice actor and ventriloquist
 Samuel V. Wilson, American army general (d. 2017)
 September 24 
 Mervyn Brown, English diplomat and historian 
 Fats Navarro, American jazz trumpet player (d. 1950)
 Li Yuan-tsu, Taiwanese politician (d. 2017)
 September 26 
 Aleksandr Alov, Soviet film director, screenwriter (d. 1983)
 Dev Anand, Indian actor, film producer, writer and director (d. 2011)
 James Hennessy, English businessman and diplomat 
 September 27 
 James Condon, Australian actor (d. 2014)
 George Dickson, American football player (d. 2020)
 September 28 
 Giuseppe Casale, Italian Roman Catholic bishop 
 Roedad Khan, Pakistani politician and civil servant
 September 29 – Nicholas Amer, English actor (d. 2019)
 September 30 
 Norman C. Gaddis, American Air Force officer and fighter pilot
 Thérèse Gouin Décarie, Canadian developmental psychologist and educator
 Donald Swann, Welsh musician and composer (d. 1994)

October

 October 1 
 Babe McCarthy, American professional and collegiate basketball coach (d. 1975)
 Mary Morello, American anti-censorship activist
 Kim Yaroshevskaya, Russian-born Canadian actress
 October 2 
 Abdullah CD, Malaysian politician 
 Shih Chun-jen, Taiwanese neurosurgeon (d. 2017)
 Absalón Castellanos Domínguez, Mexican politician (d. 2017)
 Judith Hemmendinger, German-born Israeli researcher and author 
 Eugenio Cruz Vargas, Chilean poet, painter (d. 2014)
 Hershel W. Williams, American Medal of Honour recipient (d. 2022)
 October 3
 Edward Oliver LeBlanc, Dominican politician (d. 2004)
 Stanisław Skrowaczewski, Polish-born orchestral conductor (d. 2017)
 October 4 – Charlton Heston, American actor (The Ten Commandments) (d. 2008)
 October 5
 Albert Guðmundsson, Icelandic football player, politician (d. 1994)
 Glynis Johns, South African-born Welsh actress
 Ricardo Lavié, Argentine actor (d. 2010)
 October 6 
 Yasar Kemal, Turkish writer (d. 2015)
 Robert Kuok, Malaysian-Chinese business magnate, investor 
 Yakov Neishtadt, Russian-born Israeli chess player 
 Emmett Hulcy Tidd, American military officer (d. 2018)
 October 7 – Irma Grese, German Nazi concentration camp guard, war criminal (executed 1945)
 October 9 
 Helen Corey, Syrian-American cookbook author and educator
 Haim Gouri, Israeli poet (d. 2018)
 Keshub Mahindra, Indian businessman
 V. P. Appukutta Poduval, Indian independence activist 
 October 10
 James "Jabby" Jabara, American aviator, first American jet fighter ace (d. 1966)
 Asri Muda, Malaysian politician (d. 1992)
 Nicholas Parsons, English television and radio presenter (d. 2020)
 Murray Walker, British motor racing commentator (d. 2021)
 October 13 
 Harry Pregerson, American federal judge (d. 2017)
 Faas Wilkes, Dutch football (soccer) player (d. 2006)
 October 15 
 Italo Calvino, Italian writer (d. 1985)
 Bettina Moissi, Albanian actress
 October 16 – Linda Darnell, American actress (d. 1965)
 October 17 
 Henryk Gulbinowicz, Polish cardinal (d. 2020)
 Charles McClendon, American Hall of Fame college football coach (d. 2001)
 October 18 – Eileen Sheridan, English cyclist (d. 2023)
 October 19 – Beatrix Hamburg, American psychiatrist (d. 2018)
 October 20 
 V. S. Achuthanandan, Indian politician
 Marc Clark, English-born Australian sculptor (d. 2021)
 Otfried Preußler, German children's books author (d. 2013)
 October 23 
 John Meisel, Canadian political scientist, professor and scholar
 Ned Rorem, American composer and author (d. 2022)
 Frank Sutton, American actor (d. 1974)
 Julia Wipplinger, South African tennis player
 October 24 
 Sir Robin Day, British political broadcaster (d. 2000)
 Denise Levertov, British-born American poet (d. 1997)
 October 25
 J. Esmonde Barry, Canadian healthcare activist, political commentator (d. 2007)
 Achille Silvestrini, Italian cardinal (d. 2019)
 October 27 
 Dorothy Kloss, American dancer
 Roy Lichtenstein, American pop artist (d. 1997)
 October 28 – Linda Kohen, Italian-born Uruguayan painter
 October 29 
 Vincent Cyril Richard Arthur Charles Crabbe, Ghanaian judge (d. 2018)
 Carl Djerassi, American chemist (d. 2015)
 Gerda van der Kade-Koudijs, Dutch athlete (d. 2015)

November 

 November 1
 Victoria de los Ángeles, Catalan soprano (d. 2005)
 Gordon R. Dickson, Canadian author (d. 2001)
 James Ramsden, English politician (d. 2020)
 Imre Varga, Hungarian sculptor (d. 2019)
 November 2 
 Henry Moore, English bishop 
 Cesare Rubini, Italian basketball player, coach (d. 2011)
 Ida Vitale, Uruguayan translator, author and literary critic
 November 3 
 Garnett Thomas Eisele, American district court judge (d. 2017)
 Violetta Elvin, née Prokhorova, Russian-born ballerina (d. 2021)
 Charles Nolte, American actor, director, playwright and educator (d. 2010)
 Tomás Cardinal Ó Fiaich, Irish Roman Catholic prelate (d. 1990)
 Giovanni Battista Urbani, Italian politician (d. 2018)
 November 4 
 John Herbers, American journalist, author, editor, World War II veteran and Pulitzer Prize finalist (d. 2017)
 Howie Meeker, Canadian ice hockey player and politician (d. 2020)
 November 5
 Rudolf Augstein, German journalist, founder and part-owner of magazine Der Spiegel (d. 2002)
 Kay Lionikas, Greek-American female baseball player (d. 1978)
 Aiko Satō, Japanese novelist 
 November 6 – Nizoramo Zaripova, Soviet politician and women's rights activist
 November 8
 Yisrael Friedman, Romanian-born Israeli rabbi (d. 2017)
 Józef Hen, Polish writer 
 Jack Kilby, American electrical engineer, recipient of the Nobel Prize in Physics (d. 2005)
 Jaroslav Šír, Czechoslovak soldier and skier
 November 9 – Elizabeth Hawley, American journalist (d. 2018)
 November 11 
 Victor Brombert, American professor 
 P. K. van der Byl, Rhodesian politician (d. 1999)
 William P. Murphy Jr., American medical doctor and inventor 
 Isaac Trachtenberg, Soviet-born Ukrainian hygienist (d. 2023)
 November 12 – Loriot, German actor (d. 2011)
 November 13 – Linda Christian, Mexican film actress (d. 2011)
 November 14 
 Misael Pastrana Borrero, 23rd President of Colombia (d. 1997)
 Cleyde Yáconis, Brazilian actress (d. 2013)
 November 15 
 Michael Lapage, English rower (d. 2018)
 Fred Richmond, American politician (d. 2019)
 November 17 
 Louis Danziger, American graphic designer and educator 
 Ruth W. Greenfield, American concert pianist and teacher
 Aristides Pereira, President of Cape Verde (d. 2011)
 November 18 
 Howard R. Lamar, American historian (d. 2023)
 Edith Graef McGeer, American-born Canadian neuroscientist
 Alan Shepard, first American astronaut, fifth person to walk on the moon (d. 1998)
 Ted Stevens, American politician (d. 2010)
 November 19 – Robert Harlow, Canadian writer and academic 
 November 20 – Nadine Gordimer, South African fiction writer, Nobel Prize laureate (d. 2014)
 November 22 
 Tu An, Chinese poet, translator (d. 2017)
 Martin Forde, American labor union activist
 Arthur Hiller, Canadian film director (d. 2016)
 November 23
 Betty Brewer, American actress (d. 2006)
 Billy Haughton, American harness driver, trainer (d. 1986)
 Eric Heath, New Zealand artist and illustrator 
 Keiju Kobayashi, Japanese actor (d. 2010)
 Julien J. LeBourgeois, American vice admiral (d. 2012)
 Gloria Whelan, American poet, short story writer and novelist
 November 24 – Octavio Lepage, Venezuelan politician, Acting President of Venezuela (d. 2017)
 November 25 – Mauno Koivisto, 2-Time Prime Minister of Finland and 9th President of Finland (d. 2017)
 November 26 
 Luigi Bettazzi, Italian Catholic bishop
 Tom Hughes, Australian politician and barrister
 Pat Phoenix, English actress (d. 1986)
 November 28 
 Gloria Grahame, American actress (d. 1981)
 James Karen, American actor (d. 2018)
 November 29 – Augusto Lauro, Italian prelate (d. 2023)

December

 December 1
 Maurice De Bevere, beter known as Morris, Belgian cartoonist, comics artist and illustrator (d. 2001) 
 William F. House, American otologist, inventor of the Cochlear implant (d. 2012)
 Dick Shawn, American actor (d. 1987)
 Stansfield Turner, American admiral, Director of Central Intelligence (d. 2018)
 December 2 – Maria Callas, Greek soprano (d. 1977)
 December 3
 Dede Allen, American film editor (Bonnie and Clyde) (d. 2010)
 Stjepan Bobek, Yugoslav football player (d. 2010)
 Moyra Fraser, British actress (d. 2009)
 Abe Pollin, American sports owner (d. 2009)
 December 4 
 Vincent Ball, Australian actor 
 Simon Bland, English soldier and courtier (d. 2022)
 December 5 
 Khosiat Boboeva, Tajikistani historian
 Eleanor Dapkus, American female professional baseball player (d. 2011)
 Johnny Pate, American jazz musician 
 Philip Slier, Dutch Jewish typesetter (d. 1943)
 December 6 
 Emile Hemmen, Luxembourg poet and writer (d. 2021)
 Maury Laws, American composer (d. 2019)
 Bryan Thwaites, English mathematician, educationalist and administrator 
 December 7 
 Robert Geddes, American architect (d. 2023)
 Ted Knight, American actor (d. 1986)
 December 8 
 Dewey Martin, American actor (d. 2018)
 Rudolph Pariser, American physicist and polymer chemist 
 December 9 
 Jack M. Guttentag, American professor
 Elliot Valenstein, American psychologist and neuroscientist (d. 2023)
 December 10 
 Harold Gould, American character actor (d. 2010)
 Abelardo Quinteros, Chilean composer
 Meg Woolf, English artist
 December 11 
 Betsy Blair, American film actress (d. 2009)
 Denis Brian, Welsh journalist and author (d. 2017)
 Farhang Mehr, Iranian-born American Zoroastrian scholar, writer (d. 2018)
 December 12 
 Bob Barker, American game show host (The Price Is Right)
 Bob Dorough, American pianist and composer (d. 2018) 
 Jacqueline Fleury, French resistance fighter
 Emahoy Tsegué-Maryam Guèbrou, Ethiopian nun
 Ken Kavanagh, Australian motorcycle racer (d. 2019)
 December 13
 Philip Warren Anderson, American physicist, Nobel Prize laureate (d. 2020)
 Larry Doby, African-American baseball player (d. 2003)
 Doireann MacDermott, Irish translator, writer and academic
 Alfonso Osorio, Spanish politician (d. 2018)
 Antoni Tàpies, Catalan painter (d. 2012)
 Herb Wilkinson, American basketball player
 December 14
 Sully Boyar, American actor (d. 2001)
 Chris Ogunbanjo, Nigerian lawyer and philanthropist 
 Gerard Reve, Dutch writer (d. 2006)
 December 15 
 Freeman Dyson, English-born physicist (d. 2020)
 Aishah Ghani, Malaysian politician (d. 2013)
 Viktor Shuvalov, Soviet ice hockey player (d. 2021)
 December 16 
 Jo-Carroll Dennison, American actress, Miss America (d. 2021)
 Menahem Pressler, German-American pianist 
 December 17 
 Robert William Bradford, Canadian artist 
 Jaroslav Pelikan, American historian (d. 2006)
 December 18
 Edwin Bramall, senior British Army officer (d. 2019)
 Émile Knecht, Swiss Olympic rower (d. 2019)
 December 19 – Gordon Jackson, Scottish actor (d. 1990)
 December 20 – Ambalavaner Sivanandan, Sri Lankan novelist (d. 2018)
 December 21 – Wataru Misaka, American baseball player (d. 2019)
 December 22 – Peregrine Worsthorne, English journalist, writer and broadcaster (d. 2020)
 December 23
 Dave Bolen, American athlete and ambassador (d. 2022)
 José Serra Gil, Spanish racing cyclist (d. 2002)
 Enrique Lucca, Venezuelan sports shooter
 Ivan Martynushkin, Soviet liberator of Auschwitz concentration camp
 TL Osborn, American televangelist, singer and author (d. 2013)
 James Stockdale, U.S. Navy admiral, vice presidential candidate (d. 2005)
 Earl P. Yates, American admiral (d. 2021)
 December 24 
 George Patton IV, American general (d. 2004)
 Simon Perchik, American poet (d. 2022)
 December 25
 Luis Álamos, Chilean football manager (d. 1983)
 René Girard, French-American historian (d. 2015)
 Sonya Olschanezky, World War II heroine (d. 1944)
 Satyananda Saraswati, Indian founder of Satyananda Yoga and Bihar Yoga (d. 2009)
 Billy Watson, American child actor (d. 2022)
 Jack Zunz, South African-English engineer (d. 2018)
 December 26
 Richard Artschwager, American painter, illustrator and sculptor (d. 2013)
 Dick Teague, American industrial designer (d. 1991) 
 December 27 – Lucas Mangope, President of Bophuthatswana Bantustan (d. 2018)
 December 28 
 Louis Lansana Beavogui, Guinean politician (d. 1984)
 Georg Hille, Norwegian clergyman
 Mira Sulpizi, Italian composer
 December 29 
 Yvonne Choquet-Bruhat, French mathematician and physicist 
 Cheikh Anta Diop, Senegalese historian, anthropologist, physicist and politician (d. 1986)
 Lily Ebert, Hungarian-born English Holocaust survivor 
 Dina Merrill, American actress, heiress, socialite and philanthropist (d. 2017)
 Mike Nussbaum, American actor and director
 December 30 – Carl-Göran Ekerwald, Swedish novelist, literary critic and teacher
 December 31 – Balbir Singh Sr., Indian hockey player (d. 2020)

Deaths

January 

 January 1 – Willie Keeler, American baseball player, MLB Hall of Famer (b. 1872)
 January 2
 Thomas Bavister, English-born Australian politician (b. 1850)
 Girolamo Caruso, Italian agronomist, teacher (b. 1842)
 January 3 – Jaroslav Hašek, Czech writer (b. 1883)
 January 8 – Shimamura Hayao, Japanese admiral (b. 1858)
 January 9
 Katherine Mansfield, New Zealand-born British novelist, died in France (b. 1888)
 Edith Thompson and Frederick Bywaters, British couple hanged for murder (Thompson b. 1893, Bywaters b. 1902)
 January 11 – Constantine I, abdicated king of Greece (b. 1868)
 January 12 – Herbert Silberer, Austrian psychoanalyst (b. 1882)
 January 13 – Alexandre Ribot, French statesman, 46th Prime Minister of France (b. 1842)
 January 16 – Abdul Kerim Pasha, Ottoman general (b. 1872)
 January 18 – Wallace Reid, American actor (b. 1891)
 January 19 – Amalia Eriksson, Swedish businesswoman (b. 1824)
 January 23 – Max Nordau, Hungarian author, philosopher and Zionist leader (b. 1849)
 January 27 – Carolina Santocanale, Italian Roman Catholic nun and blessed (b. 1852)
 January 30 – Columba Marmion, Irish Benedictine and Roman Catholic monk and blessed (b. 1858)
 January 31 – Eligiusz Niewiadomski, Polish artist, political activist and assassin (executed) (b. 1869)

February 

 February 1
 Ernst Troeltsch, German theologian (b. 1865)
 Luigi Variara, Italian Roman Catholic priest and blessed (b. 1875)
 February 3 – Count Kuroki Tamemoto, Japanese general (b. 1844)
 February 4
 Giuseppe Antonio Ermenegildo Prisco, Italian Roman Catholic cardinal (b. 1833)
 Prince Fushimi Sadanaru of Japan (b. 1858)
 February 5 – Count Erich Kielmansegg, former Prime Minister of Austria (b. 1847)
 February 6
 Edward Emerson Barnard, American astronomer (b. 1857)
 Gerdt von Bassewitz, Prussian general, playwright and actor (b. 1878)
 February 8 – Bernard Bosanquet, English philosopher and political theorist (b. 1848)
 February 10 – Wilhelm Röntgen, German physicist, Nobel Prize laureate (b. 1845)
 February 14 – Bartolomeo Bacilieri, Italian Roman Catholic cardinal (b. 1842)
 February 19 – Gerónimo Giménez, Spanish conductor, composer (b. 1854)
 February 21 – Prince Miguel, Duke of Viseu (b. 1878)
 February 22
 Théophile Delcassé, French statesman (b. 1852)
 Princess Marie Elisabeth of Saxe-Meiningen (b. 1853)
 February 24 – Edward W. Morley, American physicist, chemist (b. 1838)
 February 26 – Walter B. Barrows, American naturalist (b. 1855)

March 

 March 1 – Rui Barbosa, Brazilian polymath, diplomat, writer, jurist and politician (b. 1849)
William Bourke Cockran, Irish-American congressman and politician (b. 1854)
 March 3 – Melancthon J. Briggs, American lawyer, politician (b. 1846)
 March 6 – Joseph McDermott, American actor (b. 1878)
 March 8
 Pascual Álvarez, Filipino general (b. 1861)
 Johannes Diderik van der Waals, Dutch physicist, Nobel Prize laureate (b. 1837)
 March 11 – Júlia da Silva Bruhns, Brazilian merchant (b. 1851)
 March 15 – Goat Anderson, American baseball player (b. 1880)
 March 16 – George Bean, English cricketer (b. 1864)
 March 25 – Inokuchi Ariya, Japanese technologist, professor (b. 1856)
 March 26 – Sarah Bernhardt, French actress (b. 1844)
 March 27 – Sir James Dewar, British chemist (b. 1842)
 March 28 – Michel-Joseph Maunoury, French general (b. 1847)
 March 31 – Konstantin Budkevich, Soviet Roman Catholic priest and servant of God (executed) (b. 1867)

April 

 April 1 – Prince Naruhisa Kitashirakawa of Japan (b. 1887)
 April 2 – Michel Théato, Luxembourg athlete (b. 1878)
 April 4 
 Julius Martov, Russian Menshevik leader (b. 1873)
 John Venn, British mathematician (b. 1834)
 April 5 – George Herbert, 5th Earl of Carnarvon, British financier of Egyptian excavations (b. 1866)
 April 6 – Alice Cunningham Fletcher, American ethnologist and anthropologist (b. 1838)
 April 15 – Ascensión Esquivel Ibarra, 17th President of Costa Rica (b. 1844)
 April 16 – Isidore Jacques Eggermont, Belgian diplomat (b. 1844)
 April 17 – Madre Teresa Nuzzo, Maltese Roman Catholic nun and blessed (b. 1851)
 April 18 – Savina Petrilli, Italian Roman Catholic religious professed and blessed (b. 1851)
 April 22 – Frank Baldwin, American general (b. 1842)
 April 23
 Mary Cynthia Dickerson, American herpetologist (b. 1866)
 Princess Louise of Prussia (b. 1838)
 April 24 – William Ernest, Grand Duke of Saxe-Weimar-Eisenach (b. 1876)

May 
 May 2 – Alfred Harding, American Episcopal bishop (b. 1852)
 May 5 – Rosario de Acuña, Spanish author (b. 1850)
 May 9 – Constantin Cristescu, Romanian general (b. 1866)
 May 10 – Charles de Freycinet, French statesman, Prime Minister of France (b. 1828)
 May 17
 Manuel Allendesalazar y Muñoz de Salazar, Spanish nobleman, politician, and Prime Minister of Spain (b. 1856)
 Thomas Scott Baldwin, American balloonist, general (b. 1854)
 Duke Paul Frederick of Mecklenburg (b. 1852)
 May 21 
 Hans Goldschmidt, German chemist (b. 1861)
 Charles Kent, British actor (b. 1852)
 May 23 – Nicola Barbato, Italian doctor, socialist and politician (b. 1856)
 May 29 – Albert Deullin, French flying ace of World War I (b. 1890)

June 

 June 4
 Alexander Milne Calder, Scottish-born American sculptor (b. 1846)
 Filippo Smaldone, Italian Roman Catholic priest, saint (b. 1848)
 June 5 – Carl von Horn, German general (b. 1847)
 June 9
 Takeo Arishima, Japanese novelist, writer and essayist (b. 1878)
 Princess Helena of the United Kingdom, third daughter of Queen Victoria (b. 1846)
 June 10 – Pierre Loti, French writer, naval officer (b. 1850)
 June 12 – Kate Bishop, English actress (b. 1848)
 June 14
 Isabelle Bogelot, French philanthropist (b. 1838)
 Aleksandar Stamboliyski, 20th Prime Minister of Bulgaria (assassinated) (b. 1879)
 June 17 – Alexis-Xyste Bernard, Canadian Catholic bishop (b. 1847)
 June 18 – Hristo Smirnenski, Bulgarian poet (b. 1898)
 June 20 – Princess Marie of Battenberg (b. 1852)
 June 23 – Keiichi Aichi, Japanese physicist (b. 1880)
 June 24 – Edith Södergran, Finnish author (b. 1892)

July 

 July 9 – William R. Day, American lawyer and diplomat, Associate Justice of the Supreme Court of the United States (b. 1849)
 July 10 – Albert Chevalier, British music hall comedian (b. 1861)
 July 12 – Ernst Otto Beckmann, German pharmacist, chemist (b. 1853)
 July 15 – Janey Sevilla Callander, British producer (b. 1846)
 July 17 – Theodor Rosetti, 16th Prime Minister of Romania (b. 1837)
 July 19 – Auguste Bouché-Leclercq, French historian (b. 1842)
 July 20 – Pancho Villa, Mexican revolutionary (assassinated) (b. 1878)
 July 23 – Charles Dupuy, French statesman, Prime Minister of France (b. 1851)
 July 30 – Sir Charles Hawtrey, British actor (b. 1858)

August 
 August 1 – Pierre Brizon, French teacher, deputy and pacifist (b. 1878)
 August 2 – Warren G. Harding, American politician, 29th President of the United States (b. 1865)
 August 5 – Vatroslav Jagić, Croatian scholar (b. 1838)
 August 9 – Victor II, Duke of Ratibor (b. 1847)
 August 10 – Joaquín Sorolla, Spanish painter (b. 1863)
 August 19 – Vilfredo Pareto, Italian economist (b. 1848)
 August 21 – Sir William Meredith, Canadian politician and judge (b. 1840)
 August 23
 Ernest Francis Bashford, British oncologist (b. 1873)
 Henry C. Mustin, American naval aviation pioneer (b. 1874)
 August 24 
 Katō Tomosaburō, Imperial Japanese Navy officer, 12th Prime Minister of Japan (b. 1861)
 Kate Douglas Wiggin, American author (b. 1856)
 August 26 – Hertha Ayrton, English engineer, mathematician and inventor (b. 1854)
 August 27 – Edward Hill, American painter (b. 1843)
 August 29 – Princess Anastasia of Greece and Denmark (b. 1878)

September 
 September 6 – Pedro José Escalón, Salvadorian military officer, 21st President of El Salvador (b. 1847)
 September 9 – Hermes Rodrigues da Fonseca, Brazilian soldier and politician, 8th President of Brazil (b. 1855)
 September 14 – Nemesio Canales, Puerto Rican essayist, novelist, playwright, journalist, activist and politician (b. 1878)
 September 17 – Stefanos Dragoumis, Prime Minister of Greece (b. 1842)
 September 19 – Sophus Andersen, Danish composer (b. 1859)
 September 23
 Antonio Francisco Xavier Alvares, Indian Orthodox priest and saint (b. 1836)
 Carl L. Boeckmann, Norwegian-born American artist (b. 1867)
 John Morley, 1st Viscount Morley of Blackburn, British politician, editor (b. 1838)
 September 25 – Elbazduko Britayev, Russian playwright, author (b. 1881)
 September 26 – Luigi Tezza, Italian Roman Catholic priest and blessed (b. 1841)

October 
 October 3 - Kadambini Ganguly, doctor (b. 1861)
 October 6 – Damat Ferid Pasha, Grand Vizier of the Ottoman Empire
 October 10
 Herman Gottfried Breijer, Dutch-born South African naturalist, museologist (b. 1864)
 Andrés Avelino Cáceres, Peruvian general, 3-time President of Peru (b. 1836)
 October 12 – Diego Manuel Chamorro, 14th President of Nicaragua (b. 1861)
 October 23
 Hannah Johnston Bailey, American temperance advocate, suffragist (b. 1839)
 Félix Fourdrain, French organist, composer (b. 1880)
 October 26 – Charles Proteus Steinmetz, German-American engineer and electrician (b. 1865)
 October 28 
 Stojan Protić, Yugoslav statesman and writer, 1st Prime Minister of Yugoslavia (b. 1857)
 Theodor Reuss, German occultist (b. 1855)
 October 30 – Bonar Law, British politician, 39th Prime Minister of the United Kingdom (b. 1858)

November 
 November 9 (among those killed in Munich Beer Hall Putsch):
 Oskar Körner, German businessman (b. 1875)
 Karl Laforce, German student (b. 1904)
 Ludwig Maximilian Erwin von Scheubner-Richter, German diplomat, revolutionary (b. 1884)
 November 10 – Ricciotto Canudo, Italian theoretician (b. 1877)
 November 14 – Ernest Augustus, Crown Prince of Hanover (b. 1845)
 November 15 – Mohammad Yaqub Khan, Emir of Afghanistan (b. 1849)
 November 21 – Lars Emil Bruun, Danish grocer, numismatist (b. 1852)
 November 30 – Martha Mansfield, American actress (b. 1899)

December 
 December 2 – Tomás Bretón, Spanish composer (b. 1850)
 December 4 – Maurice Barres, French novelist, journalist and politician (b. 1862)
 December 9 – Meggie Albanesi, British actress (b. 1899)
 December 10 – Thomas George Bonney, English geologist (b. 1833)
 December 11 – Kata Dalström, Swedish politician (b. 1858)
 December 13 – Théophile Steinlen, Swiss painter (b. 1859)
 December 14 – Giuseppe Gallignani, Italian composer, conductor and teacher (b. 1851)
 December 22 – Georg Luger, German firearms designer (b. 1849)
 December 25 – William Ludwig, Irish opera singer (b. 1847)
 December 26 – Rafael Valentín Errázuriz, Chilean politician, diplomat (b. 1861)
 December 27 
 Gustave Eiffel, French engineer, architect (Eiffel Tower) (b. 1832)
 Lluís Domènech i Montaner, Spanish architect (b. 1850)
 December 28 – Frank Hayes, American actor (b. 1871)

Date unknown 
Józef Tretiak, Polish writer (b. 1841)

Nobel Prizes 

 Physics – Robert Andrews Millikan
 Chemistry – Fritz Pregl
 Physiology or Medicine – Frederick Grant Banting, John James Rickard Macleod
 Literature – William Butler Yeats

References